Roger Baulu, OC (28 February 1910 – 17 September 1997) was a Canadian radio and television host. He was a pioneer on the airwaves of Montreal radio station CKAC and on Ici Radio-Canada Télé radio and television. In 1990, he was inducted into the Canadian Association of Broadcasters Hall of Fame.

After his death in 1997, he was entombed at the Notre Dame des Neiges Cemetery in Montreal.

References

External links 

1910 births
1997 deaths
Canadian radio hosts
Canadian television hosts
French Quebecers
People from Montreal
Burials at Notre Dame des Neiges Cemetery
Officers of the Order of Canada